Barry Cecil Beech Mole MBE (20 September 1927 – 24 November 1999) was a British civil engineer.

Beech Mole was awarded an MBE in the 1986 New Year Honours.  His previous positions included deputy borough engineer for Abingdon Council, at Chipping Sodbury, and for Aldridge Urban District Council.

References 

1927 births
1999 deaths
20th-century British engineers
British civil engineers
Members of the Order of the British Empire
People from Walsall